Herman Schlom (1904–1983) was a film producer who first received film credit as an assistant director for Dracula in 1931.  He worked primarily for Republic Pictures then RKO Pictures. Some of Schlom's notable films, as a producer, include the crime thrillers The Devil Thumbs a Ride (1947), Born to Kill (1947), Dick Tracy Meets Gruesome (1947) and Follow Me Quietly (1949).

He was the producer of a number of Tim Holt westerns. According to Richard Martin "“Herman was one of RKO's best B producers. He could get a lot of quality into a picture for a few dollars. He lived with the pictures he was producing twenty-four hours a day, trying to refine them, make them better. He fought for excellent music backgrounds and outstanding photography."

He was also a producer of the 1956–1957 western television series My Friend Flicka, starring Johnny Washbrook, Gene Evans, Anita Louise, and Frank Ferguson.

References

External links 
 

1904 births
1983 deaths
American film producers
People from Greater Los Angeles
20th-century American businesspeople